Master Sergeant Raul Perez "Roy" Benavidez (August 5, 1935 – November 29, 1998) was a United States Army master sergeant who was awarded the Medal of Honor for his valorous actions in combat near Lộc Ninh, South Vietnam on May 2, 1968, while serving as a member of the United States Army Special Forces during the Vietnam War.

Childhood and early life
Roy P. Benavidez was born in Lindenau near Cuero, Texas in DeWitt County. He is a descendant of the founders of Benavides, Texas and was the son of a Mexican farmer, Salvador Benavidez, Jr. and a Yaqui mother, Teresa Perez.

When he was two years old, his father died of tuberculosis and his mother remarried. Five years later, his mother died from tuberculosis as well. Benavidez and his younger brother Roger moved to El Campo, where their grandfather, uncle and aunt raised them along with eight cousins.

Benavidez shined shoes at the local bus station, labored on farms in California and Washington, and worked at a tire shop in El Campo. He dropped out of school at age 15, in order to work full-time to help support the family.

Military career

US Army
Benavidez enlisted in the Texas Army National Guard in 1952 during the Korean War. In June 1955, he switched from the Army National Guard to Army active duty. In 1959, he married Hilaria Coy Benavidez, completed Airborne training, and was assigned to the 82nd Airborne Division at Fort Bragg, North Carolina.

Army Special Forces
Benavidez returned to Fort Bragg and began training for the elite Army Special Forces. Once qualified and accepted, he became a member of the 5th Special Forces Group; and the Studies and Observations Group (SOG).

Vietnam
In 1965, he was sent to South Vietnam as a Special Forces advisor to an Army of the Republic of Vietnam infantry regiment. During his tour of duty, he stepped on a land mine during a patrol and was evacuated to the United States. Doctors at Fort Sam Houston concluded he would never walk again and began preparing his medical discharge papers. As Benavidez noted in his MOH acceptance speech in 1981, stung by the diagnosis, as well as flag burnings and media criticism of the US military presence in Vietnam he saw on TV, he began an unsanctioned nightly training ritual in an attempt to redevelop his ability to walk.

Getting out of bed at night (against doctors' orders), Benavidez would crawl using his elbows and chin to a wall near his bedside and (with the encouragement of his fellow patients, many of whom were permanently paralyzed and/or missing limbs) he would prop himself against the wall and attempt to lift himself unaided, starting by wiggling his toes, then his feet, and then eventually (after several months of excruciating practice that, by his own admission, often left him in tears) pushing himself up the wall with his ankles and legs."/> After over a year of hospitalization, Benavidez walked out of the hospital in July 1966, with his wife at his side, determined to return to combat in Vietnam. Despite continuing pain from his wounds, he returned to South Vietnam in January 1968.

"Six Hours in Hell"
On May 2, 1968, a 12-man Special Forces patrol, which included nine Montagnard tribesmen, was surrounded by an NVA infantry battalion of about 1,000 men. Benavidez heard the radio appeal for help and boarded a helicopter to respond. Armed only with a knife, he jumped from the helicopter carrying his medical bag and ran to help the trapped patrol. Benavidez "distinguished himself by a series of daring and extremely valorous actions... and because of his gallant choice to join voluntarily his comrades who were in critical straits, to expose himself constantly to withering enemy fire, and his refusal to be stopped despite numerous severe wounds, saved the lives of at least eight men."

At one point in the battle an NVA soldier accosted him and stabbed him with his bayonet. Benavidez pulled it out, drew his own knife, killed him and kept going, leaving his knife in the NVA soldier's body. He later killed two more NVA soldiers with an AK-47 while providing cover fire for the people boarding the helicopter. After the battle, he was evacuated to the base camp, examined, and thought to be dead. As he was placed in a body bag among the other dead in body bags, he was suddenly recognized by a friend who called for help. A doctor came and examined him but believed Benavidez was dead. The doctor was about to zip up the body bag when Benavidez managed to spit in his face, alerting the doctor that he was alive. Benavidez had a total of 37 separate bullet, bayonet, and shrapnel wounds from the six-hour fight with the enemy battalion.

Benavidez was evacuated once again to Fort Sam Houston's Brooke Army Medical Center, where he eventually recovered. He received the Distinguished Service Cross for extraordinary heroism and four Purple Hearts. In 1969, he was assigned to Fort Riley, Kansas. In 1972, he was assigned to Fort Sam Houston, Texas where he remained until retirement.

Medal of Honor

In 1973, after more detailed accounts became available, Special Forces Lieutenant Colonel Ralph R. Drake insisted that Benavidez receive the Medal of Honor. By then, however, the time limit on the medal had expired. An appeal to Congress resulted in an exemption for Benavidez, but the Army Decorations Board denied him an upgrade of his Distinguished Service Cross to the Medal of Honor.  The Army required an eyewitness account from someone present during the action; Benavidez believed that there were no living witnesses of the events of that day, which by then had become known as "Six Hours in Hell".

Unbeknownst to Benavidez, there was a living witness, who would later provide the eyewitness account necessary: Brian O'Connor, the former radioman of Benavidez's Special Forces team in Vietnam.  O'Connor had been severely wounded (Benavidez had believed him dead), and he was evacuated to the United States before his superiors could fully debrief him.  O'Connor had been living in the Fiji Islands when, in 1980, he was on holiday in Australia.  During his holiday O'Connor read a newspaper account of Benavidez originally from an El Campo newspaper, which had been picked up by the international press and reprinted in Australia. O'Connor immediately contacted Benavidez and submitted a ten-page report of the encounter, confirming the accounts provided by others, and serving as the necessary eyewitness. Benavidez's Distinguished Service Cross accordingly was upgraded to the Medal of Honor.

On February 24, 1981, President Ronald Reagan presented Roy P. Benavidez with the Medal of Honor in the Pentagon. Reagan turned to the press and said, "If the story of his heroism were a movie script, you would not believe it". He then read the official award citation:

Rank and organization: Master Sergeant.
Organization: Detachment B-56, 5th Special Forces Group, Republic of Vietnam
Place and date: West of Loc Ninh on May 2, 1968
Entered service at: Houston, Texas, June 1955
Born: August 5, 1935, DeWitt County, Cuero, Texas

Post-military retirement
In 1976, Benavidez, his wife, and their three children returned home to El Campo, Texas. He devoted his remaining years to the youth of America, speaking to them about the importance of staying in school and getting an education. His message was simple: "An education is the key to success. Bad habits and bad company will ruin you."

In 1983, Benavidez told the press that the Social Security Administration planned to cut off disability payments he had been receiving since his retirement, as well as the disability payments for thousands of other veterans. He went to Capitol Hill and pleaded with the House Select Committee on Aging to abandon their plans, which they finally did.

 Speaker
Benavidez was in demand as a speaker by United States armed forces, schools, military and civic groups, and private businesses. He also spoke in Greece, Panama, Korea, and Japan, where he visited American military personnel and even joined them on field exercises. He received complimentary letters from students, service members, and private citizens throughout the world.

 Author
He wrote three autobiographical books about his life and military experience. In 1986, he published The Three Wars of Roy Benavidez, which described his struggles growing up as a poor Mexican-American orphan, his military training and combat in Vietnam, and the efforts by others to get recognition for his actions in Vietnam. Benavidez later wrote The Last Medal of Honor (Texas: Swan Publishers, 1991) with Pete Billac and Medal of Honor: A Vietnam Warrior's Story in 1995.

Death
Roy Benavidez died on November 29, 1998, at the age of 63 at Brooke Army Medical Center, having suffered respiratory failure and complications of diabetes. His body was escorted to St. Robert Bellarmine Catholic Church, where he had married, where his three children were married, and where he attended Mass every Sunday. His body was then returned to Fort Sam Houston's Main Chapel for a public viewing. Family friend Archbishop Patrick Flores of the Archdiocese of San Antonio presided over a Catholic funeral Mass at San Fernando Cathedral located in San Antonio.

Master Sergeant Roy Benavidez was buried with full military honors at Fort Sam Houston National Cemetery.

Military decorations and awards

Benavidez's military awards include:

Personal honors
Benavidez' personal honors include:

 
1981 Texan of the Year
Honorary Associate in Arts from the New Mexico Military Institute
Special USPS Pictorial Cancellation Stamp
Lifetime Achievement Award from St. Mary's University Alumni Law School in San Antonio, Texas
Listed on the Medal of Honor Memorial in Indianapolis, Indiana
Listed on The Medal of Honor Memorial at Riverside National Cemetery in Riverside, California
Texas Legislative Medal of Honor
GI Joe, Roy P. Benavidez Commemorative Edition – Released August 31, 2001 (First Hispanic to be honored.)
Memorial Bench at Fort Sam Houston National Cemetery

Buildings and institutions with Benavidez's name include:

Roy P. Benavidez-Robert M. Patterson "All Airborne" Chapter, 82nd Airborne Division Association, El Paso, Texas
Roy P. Benavidez American Legion Post #400 in San Antonio, Texas
Roy P. Benavidez Army Reserve Center, NAS Corpus Christi, Texas
Roy P. Benavidez Artillery Training Area 67 at Fort Sill, Oklahoma
Roy P. Benavidez City Park in Colorado Springs, Colorado
Roy P. Benavidez Elementary School in Gulfton, Houston, Texas
Roy P. Benavidez Elementary School in San Antonio, Texas
Roy P. Benavidez Foundation, Inc.
Roy P. Benavidez Military Range at Fort Knox, Kentucky
Roy P. Benavidez National Guard Armory in El Campo, Texas
 Master Sergeant Roy P. Benavidez Noncommissioned Officer Academy of the Western Hemisphere Institute for Security Cooperation, Fort Benning, Georgia
Roy P. Benavidez Scholarship Fund in El Campo
Roy P. Benavidez Special Operations Logistic Complex at Fort Bragg, North Carolina
 Roy P. Benavidez Recreation Center in Eagle Pass, Texas

The conference room owned and operated by the Department of Military Instruction of the United States Military Academy is the "Benavidez Room".  Inside the "Benavidez Room" there are signed pictures of MSG Benavidez, the citation from his Medal of Honor, and a G.I. Joe toy created in his likeness. The room is used primarily for planning Cadet Summer Military Training and hosting visitors.

The , a U.S. Navy Bob Hope-class roll on roll off vehicle cargo ship, is named in honor of MSG Benavidez.

Roy Benavidez's Medal of Honor is on display at the Ronald Reagan Library along with a video of him receiving the medal from President Reagan.

As of November 2020, there are discussions to rename Fort Hood as Fort Benavidez as part of an ongoing movement to rename installations and institutions originally named for Confederate generals.

See also

List of Medal of Honor recipients for the Vietnam War
List of Hispanic Medal of Honor recipients

Notes
Footnotes

Citations

References

External links

"Roy Benavidez." Texas State Cemetery

Elder, Daniel K. "Remarkable Sergeants: Ten Vignettes of Noteworthy NCOs", Center for the Advanced Studies of the US Army Noncommissioned Officer, April 30, 2003. (URL accessed on November 8, 2008).

1935 births
1998 deaths
American people of Yaqui descent
Burials at Fort Sam Houston National Cemetery
Members of the United States Army Special Forces
People from DeWitt County, Texas
Recipients of the Distinguished Service Cross (United States)
Recipients of the Meritorious Service Medal (United States)
Recipients of the Texas Legislative Medal of Honor
United States Army Medal of Honor recipients
United States Army personnel of the Vietnam War
United States Army soldiers
Vietnam War recipients of the Medal of Honor